Bungwahl is a small town in the Australian state of New South Wales, near Myall Lakes.  It is close to lakes and beaches and the turnoff to Seal Rocks.

Bungwall Flat Post Office opened on 1 August 1875. It was renamed Bungwahl in 1896 and closed in 1993.

References

Towns in the Hunter Region
Suburbs of Mid-Coast Council